Peltigera islandica is a cyanolichen indigenous to Iceland. Only recently discovered in 2016, it is likely that specimens currently labelled as P. membranaceae or P. neorufescens could in fact be P. islandica. This species is currently known in only Iceland and Canada.

Description
Peltigera islandica is a foliose lichen with an emerald to khaki green thallus. Apothecia are not seen, and the lichen is characterized by the down-turned and skinny lobes. The specimens seen thus far have been isolated from bare or previously disturbed soils, near driveways or trails.

References

islandica
Lichen species
Lichens described in 2016
Lichens of Iceland
Lichens of Canada
Fungi without expected TNC conservation status